Phyllonorycter pruinosella is a moth of the family Gracillariidae. It is known from Central Asia, Kazakhstan, Tajikistan, Turkmenistan and Uzbekistan.

The larvae feed on Populus species (including Populus diversifolia, Populus euphratica and Populus pruinosa) and Salix species. They probably mine the leaves of their host plant.

References

pruinosella
Moths of Asia
Moths described in 1931